Benjamin Wabura Jipcho (1 March 1943 – 24 July 2020) was a track and field athlete from Kenya, who won the silver medal in the 3000 metres steeplechase at the 1972 Summer Olympics, behind teammate Kipchoge Keino.

Jipcho won the 5000 metres race in the 1973 All-Africa Games. He also won the gold medal in the 5000 m. and 3000 m. steeplechase, and the bronze medal in the 1500 metres at the 1974 Commonwealth Games in Christchurch, New Zealand.

Jipcho may be as well known for his role in Keino's victory over Jim Ryun in the high altitude 1968 Summer Olympics in Mexico City as for his own athletic accomplishments. Sacrificing his own chances for a medal to team tactics, he pulled Keino through a 56-second first 400 metres, before being passed by his teammate with 800 metres to go and drifting back into the pack. By that point, Keino had established a lead of 20 metres or more, which Ryun's famous finishing speed could not erase. Jipcho later apologized to Ryun for acting as Keino's rabbit.

He was later quoted:
"Running for money doesn't make you run fast. It makes you run first."

His granddaughter Esther Chemutai is also a runner, while he was a distant uncle to the siblings Linet Masai and Moses Masai.

He won the silver medal in the 3000m steeplechase at the 1970 Commonwealth Games held in Edinburgh, Scotland,  finishing in front of fellow Kenyan competitor and the winner of the Gold Medal in the event at the 1968 Summer Olympics in Mexico City, Amos Biwott, who this time collected bronze.

According to his daughter, he died of cancer in Fountain Hospital in Eldoret, Kenya.

References

External links
 
 
 
 

1943 births
2020 deaths
Kenyan male middle-distance runners
Olympic athletes of Kenya
Athletes (track and field) at the 1968 Summer Olympics
Athletes (track and field) at the 1972 Summer Olympics
Olympic silver medalists for Kenya
Athletes (track and field) at the 1970 British Commonwealth Games
Athletes (track and field) at the 1974 British Commonwealth Games
Commonwealth Games gold medallists for Kenya
Commonwealth Games medallists in athletics
Kenyan male steeplechase runners
Medalists at the 1972 Summer Olympics
Olympic silver medalists in athletics (track and field)
African Games gold medalists for Kenya
African Games medalists in athletics (track and field)
Track & Field News Athlete of the Year winners
Athletes (track and field) at the 1973 All-Africa Games
People from Bungoma County
Medallists at the 1970 British Commonwealth Games
Medallists at the 1974 British Commonwealth Games